Tonta, tonta, pero no tanto (English: Foolish, Foolish, But Not So Much) is a 1972 Mexican comedy film directed by Fernando Cortés and starring María Elena Velasco as La India María.

Plot
In San Jose de Los Burros, María Nicolasa Cruz is encouraged by her cousin Eufemia, who has found work for her, to migrate to Mexico City for a better life. However, she is robbed as soon as she gets out of the train, and is homeless. But she soon finds help from TV personality Paco Malgesto, who makes an announcement of her story, where Eufemia soon goes after to pick her up.

Cast 
 Maria Elena Velasco as Maria Nicolasa Cruz
 Sergio Ramos as Crescencio "Chencho" Torrijos
 Paco Malgesto as himself
 Julián de Meriche as Wilfredo Villegas/Leandro McKinley
 Emma Arvizu as Doña Julia Escandón de León
 Anel as Lucy
 Kiki Herrera Calles as Leandro McKinley's widow
 Antonio Bravo as Esteban the butler
 Héctor Herrera as Gómez

External links

Mexican comedy films
1972 films
1972 comedy films
1970s Mexican films